Khon Kaen railway station is a railway station located in Nai Mueang Subdistrict, Khon Kaen City, Khon Kaen. The station opened on April 1, 1933, as part of the Northeastern Line Nakhon Ratchasima–Khon Kaen section. On June 24, 1941, the line extended to Udon Thani. The station was rebuilt as the first elevated station of Northeastern region in 2019, with the Thanon Chira Junction–Khon Kaen double-track railway project.

Train services 
As of November 2021, 6 trains serve Khon Kaen railway station.

Outbound

Inbound

References 

Railway stations in Thailand
Railway stations opened in 1934
1934 establishments in Siam